Maria Antonia "Toni" Yulo-Loyzaga is a Filipino government official who serves as the Secretary of the Department of Environment and Natural Resources.

Education
She attended the Georgetown University in Washington D.C. where she obtained a master's degree in government, international relations.

Career
Yulo-Loyzaga was the chairperson of the International Advisory Board of the Manila Observatory. She was also a technical advisor for the Philippine Disaster Resilience Foundation and a member of the Senior Advisory Board of the Armed Forces of the Philippines' Command and General Staff College
chairperson of the  where she worked to advance more scientific research on climate and disaster resilience.

Yulo-Loyzaga was appointed by President Bongbong Marcos as the Secretary of the Department of Environment and Natural Resources. She took oath as environment secretary on July 19, 2022.

Personal life
She is married to former basketballer Chito Loyzaga.

References

Living people
Secretaries of Environment and Natural Resources of the Philippines
Bongbong Marcos administration cabinet members
Georgetown University alumni
Year of birth missing (living people)